Johnathan Davis may refer to:

 Johnathan Davis (politician) (born 1991), Member of the Australian Capital Territory Legislative Assembly
 Johnathan Davis (businessman), former owner of IBT Media

See also
Jonathan Davis (disambiguation)
John Davis (disambiguation)
Johnny Davis (disambiguation)